Bullewijk is a neighborhood and business park in the quarter of Amsterdam-Zuidoost (Amsterdam-Southeast), Netherlands. The neighborhood received its name in 1978 and was named after the nearby river of the same name. it was created due to a partial elevation of the Bullewijker and Holendrecht polder.

Location 
Bullewijk is bordered in the east by the Amsterdam - Utrecht railway line, in the west by the Utrechtseweg, in the north by the Burgemeester Stramanweg (Mayor Straman road) and in the south by the Tafelbergweg (Table Mountain road). The neighborhood gets cut in half by the Gaasperdammerweg (from east to west) and the Holterbergweg (from north to south).

The largest and most prominent buildings include the Academic Medical Center, an IKEA shop, the Atlasgebouw (Atlas Building) and the Johan Cruyff Arena.

Design 
The Bullewijk neighborhood was designed with industrial and office zones named Amstel III, and construction started in the 1980s. According to the views of that time, the car was given full priority there, and working and living were strictly separated. G&S, a company founded in 1978, contributed the most in the construction of the Bullewijk. They built and developed about 65 buildings.

Neighbourhoods of Amsterdam
Amsterdam-Zuidoost

Content in this edit is translated from the existing Dutch Wikipedia article at :nl:Bullewijk (Amsterdam); see its history for attribution.